Oreophyton is a genus of flowering plants belonging to the family Brassicaceae.

Its native range is Ethiopia to Eastern Central and Eastern Tropical Africa.

Species:
 Oreophyton falcatum (E.Fourn.) O.E.Schulz

References

Brassicaceae
Brassicaceae genera